Dimitri Buchowetzki (1885–1932) born Dmitry Savelyevych Bukhovecky was a Russian film director, screenwriter, and actor in Germany, Sweden, United States, United Kingdom, and France.

Life and career
Initially Buchowetzki studied law. Later he starred in a number of silent films, mostly playing antagonistic characters, including Yakov Protazanov’s melodramas Giant of the Spirit (1918) and Maidservant Jenny (1918). He played the hussar officer Minski in Aleksandr Ivanovski’s Pushkin adaptation The Stationmaster (1918) and appeared in the title role of Aleksandr Razumnyi’s pro-Bolshevik film Comrade Abram (1919).
In 1919, Buchowetzki immigrated to Germany, via Poland, where 
he directed his most artistic works: the expressionistic Fedor Dostoevsky adaptation The Brothers Karamazov (1921), the historical drama Danton (1921, based on Georg Büchner’s play), and Othello (1922), all starring Emil Jannings. Bukhovetski also made high-budget period pictures such as Peter the Great (1922). Pola Negri, whom Buchowetzki had directed in the German-made Sappho (1924), invited him to Hollywood, where he directed her in a series of erotic melodramas, including Men (1924), Lily of the Dust (1926), and The Crown of Lies (1926).

Buchowetzki began work at MGM on Love (1927) with Greta Garbo and Ricardo Cortez. However, producer Irving Thalberg was unhappy with the early filming, and replaced Buchowetzki with Edmund Goulding, cinematographer Merritt B. Gerstad with William H. Daniels, and Cortez with John Gilbert.

Selected filmography
Director
 Anita Jo (1919)
 The Last Hour  (Germany, 1921)
 The Experiment of Professor Mithrany (Germany, 1921)
 Country Roads and the Big City (Germany 1921)
 Symphony of Death (Germany, 1921)
 Danton (Germany, 1921) with Emil Jannings, Werner Krauss, and Conrad Veidt
 Sappho (Germany, 1921) released by Samuel Goldwyn in the US in 1923 as Mad Love, with Pola Negri
 The Brothers Karamazov (Germany, 1921) co-director; with Emil Jannings
 Peter der Große (Germany, 1922) with Emil Jannings
 Othello (Germany, 1922) with Emil Jannings and Werner Krauss
 The Vice of Gambling (1923, Germany)
 Carousel (Sweden, 1923)
 The Countess of Paris (1923)
 Men (1924) with Pola Negri
 Lily of the Dust (1924) with Pola Negri
 The Swan (1925) with Frances Howard
 Graustark (1925) with Norma Talmadge
 Valencia (1926) with Mae Murray
 The Midnight Sun (1926) with Laura La Plante
 The Crown of Lies (1926) with Pola Negri
 The Indictment (1931) French-language version of Manslaughter (1930)
 The Night of Decision (1931) German-language version of The Virtuous Sin (1930)
 Woman in the Jungle (1931) German-language version of The Letter (1929)
 De Sensatie van de Toekomst (1931) co-director of Dutch version of Paramount film Television
 Magie moderne (1931) co-director with Charles de Rochefort of French version of Television
 Stamboul (UK, 1932), also Spanish-language version El hombre que asesino

Screenwriter
 The Bull of Olivera (1921)

References

External links

1885 births
1932 deaths
Russian film directors
Russian male film actors
Russian male silent film actors
Emigrants from the Russian Empire to France
Emigrants from the Russian Empire to Germany
Emigrants from the Russian Empire to Sweden
Emigrants from the Russian Empire to the United States
Emigrants from the Russian Empire to the United Kingdom